Trunk Train (Portuguese: Tromba Trem) is a Brazilian Flash animated series created by Zé Brandão and produced by Copa Studio. It was originally released in 2010 as an animated short for the showcase AnimaTV conducted by channels TV Cultura and TV Brasil. At the end of the short was one of those chosen to become a TV series on Cartoon Network. It has international distribution of Cake Entertainment.

Characters

Main Characters
 Gajah: a Yellow Elephant
 Duda: a Red Anteater
 Júnior
 Queen
 Capitán

Film
A film adaptation of the same name was released in Brazil on September 7, 2022 and on Canada on October 14, 2022, directed by Zé Brandão and screenplay by Debora Guimarães and Pedro Vieira. It was produced by Copa Studio, and distributed by Manequim Filmes in Brazil and Entertainment One in Canada.

References

2011 Brazilian television series debuts
2010s animated television series
Brazilian children's animated comedy television series
Brazilian flash animated television series
Portuguese-language television shows
Animated television series about elephants